Eoin O'Connor (born 21 July 2000) is an Irish rugby union player for Munster in the United Rugby Championship and Champions Cup. He plays as a lock and represents Young Munster in the All-Ireland League.

Early life
A native of Waterford, O'Connor joined local club Waterpark and represented the team in the 2018–19 Munster Junior League season whilst a sixth-year student. Ahead of the 2019–20 season, O'Connor joined Limerick All-Ireland League club Young Munster.

Munster
Having previously represented Munster at under-18 and under-19 level, O'Connor made his Munster A debut in their challenge match against provincial rivals Leinster A in January 2019, scoring a try in Munster's 26–22 win. He joined the Munster academy ahead of the 2019–20 season. Following the disruption caused by the province's recent tour to South Africa, O'Connor made his senior competitive debut for Munster in their opening 2021–22 Champions Cup fixture away to English club Wasps on 12 December 2021, starting in the province's 35–14 win.

O'Connor made his league debut for Munster as a replacement for Jean Kleyn in the province's 29–24 away defeat against South African side the Bulls in a rescheduled round 6 fixture during the 2021–22 United Rugby Championship on 12 March 2022. He joined the Munster senior squad on a one-year contract from the 2022–23 season.

References

External links
Munster Academy Profile

2000 births
Living people
Rugby union players from County Waterford
Irish rugby union players
Young Munster players
Munster Rugby players
Rugby union locks